Bromus laevipes is a species of brome grass known by the common name Chinook brome.

It is native to western North America from Washington to Baja California, where it grows in many types of habitat.

Description
It is a perennial grass which may exceed 1.5 meters in height. The leaf blades may be nearly 2 centimeters wide at the bases. The inflorescence is an open array of spikelets, the lower ones drooping or nodding. The spikelets are flattened and usually hairy or downy.

References

External links
Jepson Manual Treatment
USDA Plants Profile
Photo gallery

kalmii
Bunchgrasses of North America
Native grasses of California
Grasses of Mexico
Grasses of the United States
Flora of Baja California
Flora of the Sierra Nevada (United States)
Flora of the West Coast of the United States
Natural history of the California chaparral and woodlands
Natural history of the California Coast Ranges
Natural history of the Peninsular Ranges
Natural history of the San Francisco Bay Area
Natural history of the Santa Monica Mountains
Flora without expected TNC conservation status